The 2019 North Carolina Tar Heels football team represented the University of North Carolina at Chapel Hill as a member of Coastal Division of the Atlantic Coast Conference (ACC) during the 2019 NCAA Division I FBS football season. Led by head coach Mack Brown, in the first season of his second stint at North Carolina and his 11th overall season, the team played their home games at Kenan Memorial Stadium. The Tar Heels finished the season 7–6 overall and 4–4 in ACC play to tied for third place in the Coastal Division. They were invited to the Military Bowl, where they defeated Temple.

Preseason

Preseason media poll
In the preseason ACC media poll, North Carolina was predicted to finish in sixth in the Coastal Division.

Personnel

Coaching staff

Roster

Schedule

The game against Wake Forest, a fellow member of the Atlantic Coast Conference, was played as a non-conference game and did not count in the league standings. This was done because the two rivals otherwise only play once every six years due to conference divisional alignment.

Game summaries

vs. South Carolina

Miami (FL)

at Wake Forest

Appalachian State

Clemson

at Georgia Tech

at Virginia Tech

Starting with the 2019 season, every overtime period starting with the fifth overtime consists solely of one two-point attempt per team from the three yard line.

Duke

Virginia

at Pittsburgh

Mercer

at NC State

vs. Temple — Military Bowl

Players drafted into the NFL

References

North Carolina
North Carolina Tar Heels football seasons
Military Bowl champion seasons
North Carolina Tar Heels football